Za La Mort is a 1924 German-Italian silent action film directed by Emilio Ghione and starring Ghione, Fern Andra and Magnus Stifter. It is part of a series of silent films featuring the pulp hero Za La Mort.

Cast
 Fern Andra as Schauspielerin Perla Cristal / Prinzessin Perla
 Emilio Ghione as Maler Prof. Antonio Butty / Zalamort
 Magnus Stifter as Bildhauer Prof. Rudens / König Jaromir der Finstere
 Henry Sze as Geheimsekretär Hatsuma
 Kally Sambucini as Maja / Zalavie
 Ernst Rückert as Der verbannte Prinz
 Robert Scholz

References

Bibliography
Burke, Frank. A Companion to Italian Cinema. John Wiley & Sons, 2017.

External links

1924 films
Films of the Weimar Republic
German silent feature films
Italian silent feature films
Films directed by Emilio Ghione
German black-and-white films
1920s action films
German action films
Italian action films
National Film films
1920s German films
1920s Italian films
Silent action films
1920s German-language films